Simionești may refer to several villages in Romania:

 Simionești, a village in Budacu de Jos Commune, Bistrița-Năsăud County
 Simionești, a village in Cordun Commune, Neamț County

See also 
 Simionescu (surname)